Kotahena is a suburb part of Colombo, Sri Lanka. It is an area known as Colombo 13

Places of worship

Kotahena is the location of some places of worship:
Dipaduttamarama, where in 1885 for the first time the Buddhist flag was shown and where some jewels found in the Buddha stupa in Piprahwa and were enshrined in the Ratna Chetiya in 1908.
Sri Ponnambalavaneshwarar Hindu Temple
St. Lucia's Cathedral (1881) this is called a cathedral because it holds the chair of the bishop of the diocese in this case the Archbishop's chair. The cathedral, one of the largest churches in the entirety of Sri Lanka, is also the first bishop's house in Colombo, Bishop Bonjeen. St Benedict's College was formed by de Lasale brothers and Good Shepherd Convent was formed by Good Shepherd sisters with the invitation of Bishop Bonjeen St Lucias College was a government school but now under the Archbishop.
 St. Anthony's Shrine, Kochchikade, Kotahena (not to be confused with the town of the same name Kochchikade, Negombo), a famous shrine.
Gunananda Viharaya (Udaha Pansala) (Deepaduptharama Viharaya)
Paramananda Vihara (Pahala Pansala)
St. Thomas' Church (Ginthupitiya) - Some scholars are of the opinion that Thomas the Apostle, one of Jesus’ 12 apostles also visited Sri Lanka and preached on the hillock or plain of St. Thomas or Santhumpitiya on which St. Thomas Church, Gintupitiya now stands.

Sports venues

Kotahena is also home to the Sugadadasa Stadium, Sri Lanka's national athletics stadium.

Schools
Good Shepherd Convent Colombo 13
St Benedict's College Colombo
Kotahena Muslim Vidiyalaya
Vivekananda College Colombo
St. Lucia's College Colombo 13
Good Shepherd Girls Maha Vidyalaya Colombo 13
Wolvendhal Girls High School Colombo 13
Cathedral mix School Colombo 13
St. Anthony's Boys College Colombo 13

References

Populated places in Western Province, Sri Lanka